The 2022 Sundance Film Festival took place from January 20 to 30, 2022. Due to COVID-19 pandemic protocol, it was initially intended to be an in-person/virtual hybrid festival, but on January 5, 2022, it was announced that the in-person components would be scrapped in favor of a wholly virtual festival due to the SARS-CoV-2 Omicron variant. The first lineup of competition films was announced on December 9, 2021.

Films

U.S. Dramatic Competition 
Alice, written and directed by Krystin Ver Linden
blood, directed by Bradley Rust Gray
Breaking (premiered as 892), directed and co-written by Abi Damaris Corbin
Cha Cha Real Smooth, written, produced and directed by Cooper Raiff
Dual, written, produced and directed by Riley Stearns
Emergency, directed by Carey Williams
Master, written and directed by Mariama Diallo
Nanny, written and directed by Nikyatu Jusu
Palm Trees and Power Lines, directed and co-written by Jamie Dack
Watcher, written and directed by Chloe Okuno

U.S. Documentary Competition 
Aftershock, produced and directed by Paula Eiselt and Tonya Lewis Lee
Descendant, directed by Margaret Brown
The Exiles, directed by Ben Klein and Violet Columbus
Fire of Love, directed, co-written and co-produced by Sara Dosa
Free Chol Soo Lee, directed by Julie Ha and Eugene Yi
I Didn't See You There, directed by Reid Davenport
The Janes, directed by Tia Lessin and Emma Pildes
Jihad Rehab, directed by Meg Smaker
Navalny, directed by Daniel Roher
TikTok, Boom., directed by Shalini Kantayya

Premieres 
2nd Chance, directed by Ramin Bahrani
Am I OK?, directed by Stephanie Allynne and Tig Notaro
Brainwashed: Sex-Camera-Power, directed by Nina Menkes
Call Jane, directed by Phyllis Nagy
Downfall: The Case Against Boeing, directed and co-produced by Rory Kennedy
Emily the Criminal, written and directed by John Patton Ford
God's Country, directed and co-written by Julian Higgins
Good Luck to You, Leo Grande, directed by Sophie Hyde
Honk for Jesus. Save Your Soul., written, directed and co-produced by Adamma Ebo
jeen-yuhs: A Kanye Trilogy, directed by Clarence "Coodie" Simmons and Chike Ozah
La Guerra Civil, produced and directed by Eva Longoria Bastón
Living, directed by Oliver Hermanus
Lucy and Desi, directed and co-produced by Amy Poehler
My Old School, directed by Jono McLeod
The Princess, directed by Ed Perkins
Resurrection, written and directed by Andrew Semans
Sharp Stick, written, directed and co-produced by Lena Dunham
To the End, directed by Rachel Lears
We Need to Talk About Cosby, directed by W. Kamau Bell
When You Finish Saving the World, written and directed by Jesse Eisenberg

World Cinema Dramatic Competition 
Brian and Charles, directed by Jim Archer
The Cow Who Sang a Song Into The Future, directed by Francisca Alegría
Dos Estaciones, directed by Juan Pablo González
Gentle, directed by Anna Eszter Nemes and László Csuja
Girl Picture, directed by Alli Haapasalo
Klondike, written, directed and edited by Maryna Er Gorbach
Leonor Will Never Die, written and directed by Martika Ramirez Escobar
Marte Um (Mars One), directed by Gabriel Martins
Utama, directed by Alejandro Loayza Grisi
You Won't Be Alone, written and directed by Goran Stolevski

World Cinema Documentary Competition 
All That Breathes, directed by Shaunak Sen
Calendar Girls, directed by Maria Loohufvud and Love Martinsen
A House Made of Splinters, directed by Simon Lereng Wilmont
Midwives, directed by Snow Hnin Ei Hlaing
The Mission, directed by Tania Anderson
Nothing Compares, directed by Kathryn Ferguson
Sirens, directed by Rita Baghdadi
Tantura, directed by Alon Schwarz
The Territory, directed and co-produced by Alex Pritz
We Met in Virtual Reality, directed by Joe Hunting

Midnight
Babysitter, directed by Monia Chokri
Fresh, directed by Mimi Cave
Hatching, directed by Hanna Bergholm
Meet Me in the Bathroom, directed by Dylan Southern and Will Lovelace
Piggy, written and directed by Carlota Pereda
Speak No Evil, directed and co-written by Christian Tafdrup

Next 
The Cathedral, written, directed and edited by Ricky D'Ambrose
Every Day in Kaimukī by Alika Tengan
Framing Agnes, directed by Chase Joynt
 A Love Song, written, directed, produced and co-edited by Max Walker-Silverman
Mija, directed by Isabel Castro
RIOTSVILLE, USA, directed by Sierra Pettengill
Something in the Dirt, directed by Justin Benson and Aaron Moorhead

Spotlight
After Yang, written, directed and edited by Kogonada
Happening, directed and co-written by Audrey Diwan
Neptune Frost, directed by Saul Williams
Three Minutes: A Lengthening, directed by Bianca Stigter
The Worst Person in the World, directed by Joachim Trier

Awards 
The following awards were given out:

Grand Jury Prizes 

 U.S. Dramatic Competition – Nanny (Nikyatu Jusu)
 U.S. Documentary Competition – The Exiles (Ben Klein and Violet Columbus)
 World Cinema Dramatic Competition – Utama (Alejandro Loayza Grisi)
 World Cinema Documentary Competition – All That Breathes (Shaunak Sen)

Audience Awards 

 Festival Favorite – Navalny (Daniel Roher)
 U.S. Dramatic Competition – Cha Cha Real Smooth (Cooper Raiff)
 U.S. Documentary Competition – Navalny (Daniel Roher)
 World Cinema Dramatic Competition – Girl Picture (Alli Haapasalo)
 World Cinema Documentary Competition – The Territory (Alex Pritz)
 NEXT – Framing Agnes (Chase Joynt)

Directing, Screenwriting and Editing 

 U.S. Dramatic Competition – Jamie Dack for Palm Trees and Power Lines
 U.S. Documentary Competition – Reid Davenport for I Didn't See You There
 World Cinema Dramatic Competition – Maryna Er Gorbach for Klondike
 World Cinema Documentary Competition – Simon Lereng Wilmont for A House Made of Splinters
 Waldo Salt Screenwriting Award – K.D. Dávila for Emergency
 Jonathan Oppenheim Editing Award: U.S. Documentary – Erin Casper and Jocelyne Chaput for Fire of Love
 NEXT Innovator Prize – Chase Joynt for Framing Agnes

Special Jury Prizes 

 U.S. Dramatic Special Jury Award: Ensemble Cast – The cast of 892
 U.S. Dramatic Special Jury Award: Uncompromising Artistic Vision – Bradley Rust Gray for blood 
 U.S. Documentary Special Jury Award: Creative Vision – Margaret Brown for Descendant
 U.S. Documentary Special Jury Award: Impact for Change – Paula Eiselt and Tonya Lewis Lee for Aftershock
 World Cinema Dramatic Special Jury Award: Acting – Teresa Sánchez for Dos Estaciones
 World Cinema Dramatic Special Jury Award: Innovative Spirit – Martika Ramirez Escobar for Leonor Will Never Die
 World Cinema Documentary Special Jury Award: Excellence in Verité Filmmaking – Snow Hnin Ei Hlaing for Midwives
 World Cinema Documentary Special Jury Award: Documentary Craft – Alex Pritz for The Territory

Short Film Awards 

 Short Film Grand Jury Prize – The Headhunter's Daughter
 Short Film Jury Award: U.S. Fiction – If I Go Will They Miss Me
 Short Film Jury Award: International Fiction – Warsha
 Short Film Jury Award: Nonfiction – Displaced
 Short Film Jury Award: Animation – Night Bus
 Short Film Special Jury Award for Ensemble Cast – A Wild Patience Has Taken Me Here
 Short Film Special Jury Award for Screenwriting – Stranger Than Rotterdam with Sara Driver

Special Prizes 

 Alfred P. Sloan Feature Film Prize – After Yang
 Sundance Institute/Amazon Studios Producers Award for Nonfiction – Su Kim for Free Chol Soo Lee
 Sundance Institute/Amazon Studios Producers Award for Fiction – Amanda Marshall for God's Country
 Sundance Institute/Adobe Mentorship Award for Editing Nonfiction – Toby Shimin
 Sundance Institute/Adobe Mentorship Award for Editing Fiction – Dody Dorn
 Sundance Institute/NHK Award – Hasan Hadi for The President's Cake

Acquisitions 
 2nd Chance: Showtime Documentary Films
 A Love Song: Stage 6 Films and Bleecker Street (US distribution); Cinetic Media (North American rights); Films Boutique (International sales)
Aftershock: Onyx Collective and ABC News
Alice: Vertical Entertainment and Roadside Attractions
Am I OK?: Warner Bros. Pictures and HBO Max
 Breaking: Bleecker Street (US distribution)
Brian And Charles: Focus Features (US distribution); Universal Pictures (International distribution)
Calendar Girls: Juno Films (US distribution)
Call Jane: Roadside Attractions (US distribution)
Cha Cha Real Smooth: Apple TV+
Descendant: Netflix and Higher Ground Productions
Dual: RLJE Films (US distribution)
Emily the Criminal: Vertical Entertainment and Roadside Attractions (US distribution); Universal Pictures (International distribution)
Fire of Love: National Geographic Documentary Films and Neon
Free Chol Soo Lee: MUBI
Fresh: Searchlight Pictures and Hulu
God's Country: IFC Films
Good Luck To You, Leo Grande: Searchlight Pictures and Hulu
Honk for Jesus. Save Your Soul: Focus Features, Peacock and Monkeypaw Productions
Leonor Will Never Die: Music Box Films (North American distribution)
Living: Sony Pictures Classics (select territories including North America)
Mars One: Magnolia Pictures
My Old School: Magnolia Pictures
Nanny: Amazon Studios and Blumhouse Productions
 Navalny: Warner Bros. Pictures (North American theatrical distribution)
Neptune Frost: Kino Lorber
Nothing Compares: Showtime Documentary Films
 Palm Trees And Power Lines: Momentum Pictures
Piggy: Magnet Releasing (US distribution); Filmax (distribution in Spain)
Resurrection: IFC Films and Shudder
Sharp Stick: Utopia (US distribution)
Speak No Evil: Shudder
 The Cathedral: MUBI
The Territory: National Geographic Documentary Films
Utama: Kino Lorber (US distribution)
Watcher: IFC Midnight and Shudder (North American distribution); Focus Features and Universal Pictures (International distribution)

References 

Sundance Film Festival
Sundance Film Festival
Sundance Film Festival
2022 in American cinema
January 2022 events in the United States